Schwegenheim is a municipality in the district of Germersheim, in Rhineland-Palatinate, Germany.

Notable people
Julius von Kennel

References

Germersheim (district)
Palatinate (region)